Charenton (historically ) is a census-designated place (CDP) in St. Mary Parish, Louisiana, United States. The population was 1,903 at the 2010 census. It is part of the Morgan City Micropolitan Statistical Area. According to legend, the community received its name from one of the earliest settlers of the region, Alexandre Frere. Frere, a native of Paris, reportedly exclaimed on his deathbed that "anyone choosing to move to that part of Louisiana belonged in Charenton!" Charenton was the name of a notorious insane asylum outside of Paris.

History 
Charenton is home to one community of Chitimacha Indians. In 1855, the Chitimacha were seriously reduced by yellow fever that struck the Region. In 1881, the Chitimacha were located on Grand Lake or Lake Fausse. The census of 1900 listed six families of Chitimacha, with a total of 55 people. During this period, the Chitimacha's land base had continued to decline as reservation land was divided again and again among members unable to pay the annual taxes. As a result, the land was sold. A court divided the last  of the reservation in 1903, but attorney's fees claimed  of it two years later. Answering a plea from the Chitimacha women, Miss Sarah Avery McIlhenney purchased the land at a sheriff's sale in 1915 and immediately ceded it to the federal government who in turn placed the land in trust for the tribe. Federal recognition followed in 1917, and the Chitimacha became the only tribe in Louisiana to achieve such status. This new recognition and the land held in trust could not have come at a better time. World War I and the pressure it placed on oil companies led to exploration in the region and purchase of land there.

With their land secure, many Chitimacha found employment in the new Louisiana oil fields as drillers and foremen. Following the passage of the Indian Reorganization Act in 1934, the Chitimacha created a new tribal organization. Unfortunately, their small enrollment and success in finding work outside their reservation led to an attempt by the government to terminate their federal status in 1952. This move was ultimately defeated, and the Chitimacha, growing in number and organization, put into effect a constitution and bylaws in 1971 that remain in effect today.

The Chitimacha operate a museum, fish processing plant and school on the reservation. In addition, what began as a bingo operation grew into a lucrative casino that operates on the tribe's land in Charenton. Revenue from the Cypress Bayou casino has provided the Chitimacha with funds used to recover land historically part of the reservation. Consequently, land that had dwindled to just  has now swelled to over a thousand acres (4 km). The Chitimacha are an important part of Charenton's history as well as a major part of the current community.

Geography
Charenton is located at  (29.88436373442272,-91.5274459771368).

Demographics

2020 census

As of the 2020 United States census, there were 1,699 people, 665 households, and 414 families residing in the CDP.

2000 census
As of the census of 2000, there were 1,944 people, 677 households, and 492 families residing in the CDP. The racial makeup of the CDP was 45.68% White, 36.21% African American, 16.36% Native American, 0.36% Asian, 0.05% Pacific Islander, 0.10% from other races, and 1.23% from two or more races. Hispanic or Latino of any race were 1.18% of the population.

There were 677 households, out of which 38.3% had children under the age of 18 living with them, 51.7% were married couples living together, 14.2% had a female householder with no husband present, and 27.3% were non-families. 23.8% of all households were made up of individuals, and 9.3% had someone living alone who was 65 years of age or older. The average household size was 2.87 and the average family size was 3.42.

In the CDP, the population was spread out, with 30.7% under the age of 18, 9.2% from 18 to 24, 29.1% from 25 to 44, 21.1% from 45 to 64, and 9.9% who were 65 years of age or older. The median age was 32 years. For every 100 females, there were 105.3 males. For every 100 females age 18 and over, there were 101.3 males.

The median income for a household in the CDP was $27,837, and the median income for a family was $32,426. Males had a median income of $33,235 versus $20,517 for females. The per capita income for the CDP was $12,828. About 26.8% of families and 27.6% of the population were below the poverty line, including 38.1% of those under age 18 and 22.6% of those age 65 or o

Education
The Chitimacha Tribal School, a K-8 school, is affiliated with the Bureau of Indian Education (BIE). It is in Charenton.

In 1937 a two classroom public school building condemned by the St. Mary Parish School Board was moved to Charenton, and began serving the community as a 1-8 school; the student population went over 60. In 1968 the kindergarten was established. The Bureau of Indian Affairs (BIA) built a new school, which began operations in 1978, to replace the former facility. It had 38 in the 1978-1979 school year, but this went down to 29 in 1980-1981 and 22 in 1981-1982. In 1982 it got a funding cut due to Reaganomics, which led to fears that the school could close.

St. Mary Parish School Board operates local public schools.

Notable residents
Notable natives of Charenton
Dr. Emmanuel Paul Bercegeay, Founding Professor and Head of School of Petroleum Engineering at University of Louisiana, Lafayette (1950s-1970's) President of UL University College 1980's
Leslie Bercegeay, Head of the Aeronautical Engineering Department, NARF, MCAS Cherry Point, NC (brother of Dr. Emmanuel Paul Bercegeay)
Anne Bercegeay Caffery Iberia Parish Elected Representative to the Louisiana Republican State Central Committee 2000-2008, wife of United States Representative Patrick Thomson Caffery of St. Mary and Iberia Parish.

References

External links
 Official website of the Chitimacha Nation

Census-designated places in Louisiana
Census-designated places in St. Mary Parish, Louisiana
Chitimacha